The 2021–22 Murray State Racers men's basketball team represented Murray State University in the 2021–22 NCAA Division I men's basketball season. The Racers, led by seventh-year head coach Matt McMahon, played their home games at the CFSB Center in Murray, Kentucky as members of the Ohio Valley Conference. They finished the season 31–3, 18–0 in OVC play to finish as regular season champions. As the No. 1 seed, they defeated Southeast Missouri State and Morehead State to win the OVC tournament. They received the conference's automatic bid to the NCAA tournament as the No. 7 seed in the East Region, where they defeated San Francisco in the first round before losing to Saint Peter's in the second round.

On January 7, 2022, Murray State announced that the season was the last season for the team in the OVC as they will join the Missouri Valley Conference in July 2022.

On March 21, head coach Matt McMahon left the school to take the head coaching job at LSU. On March 28, the school named former Murray State and Iowa State head coach Steve Prohm the team's new head coach. Prohm previously coached Murray state from 2006 to 2011 as an assistant and as head coach from 2011 to 2015.

Previous season
In a season limited due to the ongoing COVID-19 pandemic, the Racers finished the 2020–21 season 13–13, 10–10 in OVC play to finish in a tie for fifth place. In the OVC tournament, they were defeated by Jacksonville State in the quarterfinals.

Roster

Schedule and results

|-
!colspan=12 style=| Non-conference regular season

|-
!colspan=12 style=| Ohio Valley regular season

|-
!colspan=9 style=| Ohio Valley tournament

|-
!colspan=9 style=| NCAA tournament

Source

Rankings

*AP does not release post-NCAA Tournament rankings.^Coaches did not release a Week 1 poll.

References

Murray State Racers men's basketball seasons
Murray State Racers
Murray State Racers men's basketball
Murray State Racers men's basketball
Murray State